C. caroliniana  may refer to:
 Cassia caroliniana, a synonym for Senna occidentalis, the coffee senna, a pantropical plant species
 Commelina caroliniana, the Carolina dayflower, a plant species
Carpinus caroliniana, the American hornbeam, a small hardwood tree